Stupava is a town in western Slovakia. It is situated in the Malacky District, Bratislava Region.

Etymology
The name is derived from Proto-Slavic stǫpa - a wooden bowl carved from a tree trunk, but also the name of various crushing and pressing tools.

Geography
Apart from the core part of the city, Mást, located just south of the core part of the city, is another part of Stupava. It has been initially a separate village with ethnic Croatian majority, which was formally annexed by Stupava in 1953.

History
However, traces of habitation go back to the Bronze Age, and the first known inhabitants were the Celts. The Romans built a military station as a part of the near Limes Romanus on the Danube. The first written mention about the town was in 1269 in a document of the King Béla IV under name Ztumpa. In the second half of the 13th century the now-ruined Pajštún Castle in the Little Carpathians was built. It was developing mainly as an agricultural and trading settlement. The name of the town comes from the pressing mills called stupa on the Stupavský potok brook, which were used for extracting oil from flax and hemp.

Landmarks
Stupava Castle, originally built as a water castle, rebuilt in the 17th century to the Renaissance château, now serving as a retirement home
Roman Catholic church in Baroque style from the first half of the 17th century
Baroque-style Calvary chapel from the beginning of the 18th century

Demographics
According to the 2021 census, the town had 15,095 inhabitants. 96.7% of inhabitants were Slovaks, 1% Czechs and 0.5% Hungarians. The religious makeup was 70.4% Roman Catholics, 19.5% people with no religious affiliation and 2% Lutherans.

Twin towns — sister cities

Stupava is twinned with:

 Ivančice, Czech Republic
 Kuřim, Czech Republic
 Łowicz, Poland
 Nagykovácsi, Hungary
 Svoge, Bulgaria

References

External links

 Official website

Cities and towns in Slovakia
Villages and municipalities in Malacky District